Petar Vrankić (born 1947) is a German and Croatian church historian.

Biography 

Vrankić was born in Glavatičevo near Konjic in SR Bosnia and Herzegovina, at the time part of Yugoslavia. He studied theology at the Faculty of Catholic Theology in Split and continued his education in Rome. Together with Želimir Puljić he was ordained a priest in 1974. After gaining licenciate in theology in 1976, Vrankić studied church history and related studies at the Pontifical Gregorian University in Rome, where he earned his PhD in 1980.

After he finished his education, Vrankić lectured church history and ecumenical theology at the Theological Seminary of Vrhbosna in Sarajevo. He moved to Augsburg, Germany in 1986 and started to lecture at the Faculty of Theology, University of Augsburg. He continued to write historical articles in Croatian. From 1998 until 2004 he lectured at the Pontifical University of the Holy Cross, and retired in 2012. He currently lives in Augsburg, where he continues to deal with church history.

Vrankić published in Croatian, Italian, German and English language.

Works

German

Italian

Notes

References

News articles 

 
 

1947 births
People from Konjic
Croats of Bosnia and Herzegovina
Pontifical Gregorian University alumni
20th-century Bosnia and Herzegovina Roman Catholic priests
20th-century Bosnia and Herzegovina historians
20th-century Croatian Roman Catholic priests
20th-century Croatian historians
21st-century German Roman Catholic priests
21st-century German historians
Historians of the Catholic Church
Living people
21st-century Bosnia and Herzegovina Roman Catholic priests